Patrick Stephan Kluivert (born 1 July 1976) is a Dutch former football player, coach and sporting director. He played as a striker, most notably for AFC Ajax, FC Barcelona and the Netherlands national team.

He was part of Ajax's Golden Generation of the 1990s at the age of 18, scoring the winner in the 1995 UEFA Champions League Final. He spent six years with Spanish club Barcelona where he formed a successful partnership with Rivaldo, where both won the Spanish La Liga championship of 1999 and Kluivert scored 124 goals from 249 appearances in all.

Kluivert played for the Netherlands national team from 1994 to 2004. With 40 goals in 79 appearances, he is the third highest top goalscorer for Oranje. He played in three European Championships and the 1998 FIFA World Cup, and was joint top scorer at Euro 2000 where upon the scoresheet he tallied a total of five times. In 2004, he was named in the FIFA 100, a list of the 125 greatest living footballers chosen by Pelé as part of FIFA's centenary observances. He is considered one of the best Dutch strikers of all time.

Kluivert was an assistant manager at AZ and NEC, as well as in Australia with the Brisbane Roar, before coaching Jong FC Twente to a national title in the Dutch reserves league. He was assistant manager to Louis van Gaal with the Dutch team that finished third at the 2014 FIFA World Cup in Brazil. In 2015, he took over as head coach of the Curaçao national team for the country's 2018 FIFA World Cup qualifying and the 2017 Caribbean Cup qualifying campaigns. He then served as a sporting director for Paris Saint-Germain and Barcelona's academy, as well as coaching  the Ajax A1 (under-19) team and assisting Clarence Seedorf for the Cameroon national team.

Early life
Kluivert was born on 1 July 1976 in Amsterdam, Netherlands. His father, a professional football player, was born in Suriname and his mother in Curaçao. Kluivert learned to play football on the street. After a year at football club Schellingwoude, he joined the Ajax Youth Academy at the age of seven.

He played several different positions as a youth, including defender. He was strong in technique, football intelligence, and speed, but was considered too impulsive. Kluivert played for the Dutch national teams under-15, under-16 and under-17.

Club career

Ajax
Kluivert was part of Ajax's Golden Generation of the 1990s. He made his debut in the senior team of Ajax on 21 August 1994 at the age of 18 in the Dutch Supercup win against the old arch rival Feyenoord, in which he scored his first goal. He went on to top score for Ajax in the 1994–95 Eredivisie with 18 goals in 25 appearances, as Louis van Gaal's team won the Dutch championship without losing a match.

The 1994–95 season also saw Kluivert make his mark – along with a host of youngsters from the Ajax youth academy, including Edgar Davids, Clarence Seedorf, and Edwin van der Sar – on the European stage with a triumph in the UEFA Champions League. Kluivert came off the bench to score an 85th-minute winner in the 1995 Champions League Final against A.C. Milan in Vienna, Austria. The youngest player to score in a final of the main event of the European continent, when he was only 18 years, 10 months and 23 days.

He again top-scored for Ajax in 1995–96 with 15 goals in 28 appearances as the club won five trophies, including the Eredivisie title. He scored the winning goal in extra time of the season opening Dutch Supercup against Feyenoord and also scored the team's away goal in the 5–1 aggregate win over Real Zaragoza in the 1995 UEFA Super Cup.

On 28 November 1995, Kluivert was the only Ajax player to miss his kick in the 4–3 penalty shootout win over Grêmio in Tokyo that saw de Godenzonen win the Intercontinental Cup. Kluivert was also in excellent form during Ajax's defence of their Champions League trophy, scoring in away wins at Real Madrid and Borussia Dortmund, but a knee injury prevented him from participating for the full 90 minutes in the team's loss to Juventus in the 1996 UEFA Champions League Final.

At the end of an injury hit 1996–97 season in which he made only 17 league appearances, Kluivert joined AC Milan on a Bosman transfer after rejecting Ajax's offer of a new contract. He ended his spell at the Amsterdam club with 39 goals from 70 Eredivisie matches.

AC Milan
Kluivert's career at Milan started well, with the striker scoring a sensational goal against Juventus in the Trofeo Luigi Berlusconi. However, he spent only one season at the San Siro, scoring six times in 27 Serie A matches, as the Rossoneri finished in 10th place.

Barcelona
On 28 August 1998, an hour before the transfer deadline, Kluivert signed a four-year contract with FC Barcelona for a fee of £8.75 million. Kluivert was reunited with Louis van Gaal, a mentor from his days at Ajax. Kluivert scored 16 league goals and formed a successful partnership with Rivaldo, which enabled Barça to defend the Spanish La Liga in 1998–99. The following season was also a successful one for Kluivert. Although Barcelona failed to win a third consecutive league title, Kluivert finished the season as the club's top scorer with 15 league goals. Kluivert went on to top score twice more in his next four seasons at Camp Nou but the team completed a period of five years without a major trophy after their title success in 1999.

In the summer of 2004, Kluivert was one of four Dutch players released by Barcelona. He ended his career at Barça with 124 goals from 249 appearances. In 2015, the Dutchman once again featured for Barca in a legends game against Uganda all stars where he, in lobbing the ball, scored an amazing goal.

Newcastle United
Kluivert joined Newcastle United on a free transfer in July 2004. He stated that his reasons for joining Newcastle was due to the overwhelming reaction he received whilst playing for Barcelona against Newcastle during a pre season friendly as well as teaming up with Newcastle's star players such as Alan Shearer. Kluivert scored some classy and crucial goals at and away from St James' Park namely in winning strikes against both Chelsea and Tottenham Hotspur in the FA Cup, with both games ending 1–0 to Newcastle. He also scored away against Olympiakos in a 3–1 win in the first leg of the round of 16 of the UEFA Cup. Kluivert eventually scored five goals in all in that season's UEFA Cup. He altogether scored 13 goals in his debut season, being Newcastle's overall second highest goal scorer for the 2004–05 season. Despite these feats, Kluivert was then released by Newcastle in the summer of 2005.

Valencia
Kluivert decided to return to Spain to play at the Mestalla for Valencia CF. During that 2005–06 season, Valencia finished third in La Liga thus qualifying for the Champions League after a one-season absence. Kluivert played for a total of 202 minutes, as he spent most of that season injured.

PSV
Despite widespread rumours that Kluivert was to return home to Johan Cruyff Arena, Kluivert's return to the Eredivisie was to be with PSV, with whom he signed a one-year deal in 2006. Just as with his debut for Ajax, Kluivert made his PSV debut against Feyenoord in a 2–1 win, coming on as a substitute. After that, he had two injuries during the first half of the season, which limited his playing time. In a game against Ajax at the Philips Stadion, Kluivert refused to celebrate after scoring a goal against his former club. He was eventually released in July 2007.

Lille
On 25 July 2007, Kluivert joined French side Lille.

International career
Kluivert made his full international debut on 16 November 1994 in a European qualifier against the Czech Republic, replacing Youri Mulder after 13 minutes of a 0–0 draw in Rotterdam. In his second match, on 29 March 1995, he replaced Ronald de Boer after 77 minutes, and seven minutes later scored his first international goal to wrap up a 4–0 home qualifying win over Malta.

In December 1995, Kluivert scored both goals in the Netherlands' 2–0 UEFA Euro 1996 qualifying play-off win over the Republic of Ireland at Anfield, to qualify the Oranje for UEFA Euro 1996. Kluivert missed most of the tournament with a knee injury but he scored against host nation England, to enable the Netherlands to qualify for the knock-out round over Scotland on goals scored. There, they lost in a penalty shootout to France.

At the 1998 FIFA World Cup, Kluivert was sent off against Belgium by referee Pierluigi Collina after elbowing Lorenzo Staelens. He made amends when selected to play against Argentina in the quarter-finals of the same tournament where he scored the opening goal. In the next round, he scored a late equalising goal from a header to draw his team level with Brazil in the semi-final, although the Netherlands went on to lose the penalty shootout.

At UEFA Euro 2000 held in the Netherlands and Belgium, Kluivert scored a hat-trick in the 6–1 quarter-final demolition of Yugoslavia; he was originally credited with four goals, but the third was later re-attributed as an own goal by Yugoslavia's Dejan Govedarica after Kluivert admitted not getting a touch on Paul Bosvelt's cross. Had all four goals stood, Kluivert would have been the first player to score four times in a European Championship finals match. The Dutch were eliminated in the semi-finals by Italy on penalties; he missed one of their two spot-kicks in normal time, but did score in the penalty shoot-out. With five goals in as many games, he claimed the Golden Boot jointly with Savo Milošević.

Kluivert would once again enter UEFA Euro 2004 wearing the famous #9 jersey for his country with the Dutch reaching the semi-finals of the tournament.

As well as from being left out of the 2006 FIFA World Cup squad by coach Marco van Basten, Kluivert was not called up to play in any of the qualifying games leading up to the World Cup either. This was due to the fact that he suffered persistent injuries which prevented him from playing for his club during the 2005-06 season. Kluivert was the all-time leading goalscorer for the Dutch national team with 40 goals, until he was surpassed by Robin van Persie in 2013.

Style of play
Although tall in stature, Kluivert possessed a remarkably impressive 'first touch' and quick feet for such a large striker. Similar to Brazilian footballer Ronaldo, he often used several feints, namely the Cruijff Turn, to great effect to go past defenders, due to his pace, strong technical skills, close control, and football intelligence. Kluivert also utilised his height, power, and strong physique to dominate aerial balls and was considered to possess one of the best headers in the then-contemporary game. A versatile player, with an eye for goal, he also possessed good vision, and was capable of playing in several other positions across the pitch. Despite his ability, he drew criticism for his character and attitude throughout his career.

Coaching career

Early career
On 29 April 2008, Dutch media reported that Kluivert would take part in the coaching course of the Dutch Football Association (KNVB) to become a professional football coach. The KNVB requires that all coaching badge candidates complete this sort of apprenticeship.

On 18 July 2008, it was reported on the football website Goal.com that Kluivert would be spending the 2008–09 season as a member of the backroom coaching staff of Eredivisie club AZ. Later on, in an interview on Soccer AM, Kluivert revealed his role involved coaching the strikers at AZ.

In January 2010, Kluivert took a position as an assistant coach for Australian A-League side Brisbane Roar FC under head coach Ange Postecoglou.

On 19 May 2010, Kluivert told journalists he ruled out a comeback as a football player. From August 2010 on, he was an assistant-coach for N.E.C., coaching the strikers. In the 2011–12 season, he moved on and took charge of the FC Twente youth and reserve team, coaching Jong FC Twente to a national title in the Beloften Eredivisie.

In August 2012, Kluivert joined the Netherlands national team coaching staff to work under head coach Louis van Gaal. Kluivert's time with the Netherlands culminated with a third-place finish in the 2014 FIFA World Cup campaign.

Curaçao
On 5 March 2015, it was announced that Kluivert would take over as manager of the Curaçao national football team for the 2018 FIFA World Cup qualification. Curaçao progressed through the first two qualifying rounds, defeating Montserrat and Cuba. On 8 September 2015 Curaçao were eliminated in the 2018 FIFA World Cup third qualifying round by El Salvador, losing 2–0 on aggregate score. Having helped the country to their best performance yet in World Cup qualifying, Kluivert announced the end of his tenure as head coach of the team on 10 September 2015. While pursuing other ventures, he remains a close advisor to the Curaçao Football Federation.

On 24 February 2016, Kluivert announced his decision to remain head coach of Curaçao ahead of the teams' Caribbean Cup qualifying matches against the Dominican Republic and Barbados. On 2 May 2016, it was announced that Kluivert would take over as head coach of the Ajax A1 (under-19) selection ahead of the 2016–17 season, where he would coach his son Justin Kluivert with the team having secured placement in the UEFA Youth League the previous year.

Following his announcement to join Ajax, Kluivert remained head coach of Curaçao for round two of the Caribbean Cup qualifiers where they faced Guyana and the U.S. Virgin Islands in group 3. Curaçao won both their matches at home, defeating Guyana 5–2 and the U.S. Virgin Islands 7–0 in his final match as head coach of the island nation. On 14 July 2016 it was announced that Kluivert would no longer coach the under-19 team of Ajax, but that he would instead take over the position as director of football for French club Paris Saint-Germain. He expressed that his intention was to stay with Ajax, but that he could not refuse the offer made by PSG.

His efforts for the national team of Curaçao did not go without merit as the team secured qualification for both the 2017 Caribbean Cup and the 2017 CONCACAF Gold Cup, where they would compete for the first time in 40 years under the guidance of Remko Bicentini and Kluivert.

Later career
In August 2018 Kluivert became Seedorf's assistant at the Cameroon national football team, before being sacked together in July 2019.

Kluivert became the academy director of FC Barcelona days after leaving Cameroon. The club announced in March 2021 that his contract would be allowed to expire in June.

In May 2021, Kluivert returned to the Curaçao national team on an interim basis while compatriot Guus Hiddink recovered from COVID-19. In July, the team withdrew from the 2021 CONCACAF Gold Cup due to an outbreak of the same virus.

Media
Kluivert has appeared in commercials for the American sportswear company Nike. In 1996, he starred in a Nike commercial titled "Good vs Evil" in a gladiatorial game set in a Roman amphitheatre. Appearing alongside football players from around the world, including Ronaldo, Paolo Maldini, Eric Cantona, Luís Figo and Jorge Campos, they defend "the beautiful game" against a team of demonic warriors, before it culminates with Cantona striking the ball and destroying evil.

Personal life
Kluivert is the second son of former football player Kenneth Kluivert, who played for SV Robinhood in the SVB Hoofdklasse and for the Suriname national team. His mother Lidwina Kluivert, was born in Willemstad, Curaçao, in the former Netherlands Antilles, to a Surinamese father and Curaçaoan mother..Lidwina passed away in February 27, 2023 due to long term health-struggles. His parents were married in Paramaribo, and both his elder siblings were born in Suriname, before the family emigrated to the Netherlands in 1970.

On 9 September 1995, Kluivert was the driver in a car accident in Amsterdam, where a 56-year-old man was killed and a passenger was seriously injured. Kluivert collided with another car while driving an uninsured BMW at a speed of at least 100 km/h (62 mph) in a 50 km/h (31 mph) zone. He was found guilty of causing death by dangerous driving and sentenced to 240 hours of community service.

He has 6 children, (Demi, Nino, Quincy, Justin, Ruben and Shane). Justin moved from Ajax to A.S. Roma in 2018, and was capped for the Netherlands, while Ruben made his debut for FC Utrecht in 2022.

Career statistics

Club

International

Scores and results list the Netherlands' goal tally first, score column indicates score after each Kluivert goal.

Managerial statistics

Honours

Player
Ajax
Eredivisie: 1994–95, 1995–96
Super Cup: 1994, 1995
UEFA Champions League: 1994–95
UEFA Super Cup: 1995
Intercontinental Cup: 1995

Barcelona
La Liga: 1998–99

PSV
Eredivisie: 2006–07NetherlandsFIFA World Cup fourth place: 1998
UEFA European Championship bronze: 2000Individual Ballon d'Or: 5th place (1995) 
UEFA Euro 2000 Golden Boot (five goals)
UEFA Euro 2000 Team of the Tournament
FIFA 100
 Netherlands All-Time Top Scorer: 2003–2013
Dutch Football Talent of the Year: 1995
Bravo Award: 1995

ManagerJong FC Twente'''
Beloften Eredivisie: 2011–12

References

External links

 
 Patrick Kluivert.com 
 FootballDatabase provides Patrick Kluivert's profile and stats
 Patrick Kluivert at PSV by Tvw
 
 Netherlands profile at OnsOranje
 

1976 births
Living people
Patrick
Dutch people of Curaçao descent
Dutch sportspeople of Surinamese descent
Footballers from Amsterdam
Dutch footballers
Association football forwards
ASV De Dijk players
AFC Ajax players
A.C. Milan players
FC Barcelona players
Newcastle United F.C. players
Valencia CF players
PSV Eindhoven players
Lille OSC players
Eredivisie players
Serie A players
La Liga players
Premier League players
Ligue 1 players
UEFA Champions League winning players
Netherlands youth international footballers
Netherlands international footballers
UEFA Euro 1996 players
1998 FIFA World Cup players
UEFA Euro 2000 players
UEFA Euro 2004 players
FIFA 100
Dutch expatriate footballers
Dutch expatriate sportspeople in Italy
Dutch expatriate sportspeople in Spain
Dutch expatriate sportspeople in England
Dutch expatriate sportspeople in France
Expatriate footballers in Italy
Expatriate footballers in Spain
Expatriate footballers in England
Expatriate footballers in France
Dutch football managers
Curaçao national football team managers
AFC Ajax non-playing staff
Paris Saint-Germain F.C. non-playing staff
FC Barcelona non-playing staff
Dutch expatriate football managers
Dutch expatriate sportspeople in Curaçao
Expatriate football managers in Curaçao
Sportspeople convicted of crimes